Najeh Trenadious Monté Davenport (born February 8, 1979) is a former American football running back in the National Football League. He was drafted by the Green Bay Packers in the fourth round of the 2002 NFL Draft. He played college football at the University of Miami.

In addition to the Packers, Davenport played for the Pittsburgh Steelers and Indianapolis Colts.

College career
Davenport attended the University of Miami, where he played primarily as a halfback. Chosen as the offensive captain, he won an NCAA Division I-A national football championship as a member of the Hurricanes in 2001. He earned a Bachelor of Arts degree in theatre with a minor in education at the University of Miami. He was chosen by the Packers in the fourth round of the 2002 NFL Draft with the 135th overall pick.

Professional career

Green Bay Packers
During his NFL career, Davenport struggled with fumbles and with injuries that kept him off the playing field.  Davenport's abilities exceed a fourth-round selection, but as many scouts predicted, Davenport was plagued by injuries throughout his career. In his rookie campaign, he rushed for a respectable 4.7 yards per carry average before fracturing his left eye socket.

In 2003, injuries were minimal and he rushed for 5.45 yards per carry, good for the second highest in the NFL, and 30.1 yards per kick return. However, in the 2004 season, Davenport started the season with a lingering hamstring injury that kept him out for a month.  On November 29, 2004, Davenport, in his first NFL start, rushed for 178 yards, third highest debut start yardage in the NFL for the past 20 years. Later that year, Davenport broke his ribs, resulting in playing at far less than 100 percent.

In 2005, after starting running back Ahman Green went down with a quadriceps injury, Davenport took over as starter. In what would be his only start of the season, versus the New Orleans Saints, Davenport scored two first-half touchdowns before breaking his ankle. He was subsequently placed on injured reserve, effectively ending his season.

Pittsburgh Steelers
Davenport was released by the Packers on September 2, 2006, when the team made their final roster cuts. Six days later, on September 8, 2006, however, Davenport was signed to the roster of the Pittsburgh Steelers. He finished the 2006 season with a total of 221 rushing yards.

After the Steelers signed veteran running back Kevan Barlow, Davenport was facing competition with Barlow for the second and third string positions. However, Barlow was cut during training camp, and Davenport assumed the second-string responsibilities for Pittsburgh's opener against Cleveland. Davenport rushed for 43 yards on eight carries in the Steelers' 34–7 win.

Arguably his best game with the Steelers came on Thursday, December 20, 2007, against the St. Louis Rams.  Davenport had 24 carries for 123 yards and a touchdown, as well as two catches for 44 yards and another touchdown. Davenport came into the game to relieve Willie Parker, who broke his fibula in the first quarter.

The Steelers released Davenport on June 28, 2008. He was re-signed on September 30 following injuries to Willie Parker, Rashard Mendenhall and Carey Davis. The Steelers released him again on November 8, only to re-sign him on November 27 due to the injury to Parker. Davenport was released once more on December 2.

Indianapolis Colts
Davenport was signed by the Indianapolis Colts on December 9, 2008. In two games with the Colts, he had eight rushes for 26 yards and caught four passes for 54 yards. He was released on January 3, 2009, after the team elevated offensive tackle Michael Toudouze from the practice squad.

NFL statistics
Rushing Statistics 

Receiving Statistics

Returning Statistics

Personal life

Burglary and criminal mischief charge 
Prior to entering the NFL, Davenport allegedly broke into the dorm room of a Barry University woman and defecated in a laundry basket on April 1, 2002. A woman sleeping in the room told police she was startled by a strange grunting sound and observed Davenport in a squatted position, evacuating his bowels and voiding into a laundry hamper in her closet. In a plea bargain, his felony charge of second-degree burglary and misdemeanor count of criminal mischief were dropped in exchange for his completing 100 hours of community service.  Davenport maintained his innocence after the hearing, demanding outside of the courthouse, "Where's the evidence? Where's the manure? I know I didn't do it – I just wanted to get it over with."

During his career, Davenport was given the nicknames "Dookie" and "The Dump Truck." While playing for the Packers, a portable commode was placed inside of his locker during training camp as a rookie hazing prank, and a spirited letter writing campaign to the Green Bay team equipment manager asked in jest that he be issued jersey Number Two for practice, which is still referenced during the opening of the "D-List" show on WAUK ESPN 540 in Milwaukee. All are plays on the incident.

Alleged domestic violence 
Davenport was charged in Cleveland with domestic violence, endangering, and unlawful restraint in an October 2007 incident involving the mother of his five-year-old son. He entered a plea of not guilty days later and the case went to trial on April 4, 2008. After a four-day trial, an eight-member jury spent three and a half hours deliberating before finding Davenport not guilty of all counts.

Race-based Discrimination in NFL Concussion Settlement 
On October 25th, 2020, Davenport and another ex-NFL player, Kevin Henry (cousin of professional wrestling great Mark Henry and coincidentally also an ex-Steeler), filed a lawsuit against the NFL  stating the NFL used "race-norming" as a factor to determine neurocognitive impairment as part of the NFL's Concussion Settlement. The complaint stated that Black players' neurocognitive impairment score was adjusted by making an assumption that Black players started with a lower cognitive ability than a non-Black player.  This adjustment made it more difficult for Black players to prove cognitive decline compared to non-Black players. On October 21st, 2021, the NFL and lawyers for thousands of retired NFL players reached an agreement to end race-based adjustments in cognitive testing related to the NFL's Concussion Settlement.

References

External links
Green Bay Packers bio
Pittsburgh Steelers bio
Indianapolis Colts bio
Miami Hurricanes bio

1979 births
Living people
Players of American football from Raleigh, North Carolina
American football fullbacks
Miami Hurricanes football players
Green Bay Packers players
Pittsburgh Steelers players
Indianapolis Colts players